Changtanping Township is an rural township in Sangzhi County, Zhangjiajie, Hunan Province, China.

Administrative division
The township is divided into 8 villages, the following areas: Shuiliu Village, Lujiashan Village, Chishiping Village, Changtanping Village, Changtanping Village, Linjiabao Village, Shuazhuxi Village, Tianyanchi Village, and Hongyanshan Village (水流村、路家山村、赤石坪村、长潭坪村、林家包村、刷注溪村、天眼池村、红岩山村).

References

External links

Former towns and townships of Sangzhi County